"Don't You (Forget About Me)" is a song by the Scottish rock band Simple Minds, released as a single in 1985. It was written and composed by the producer Keith Forsey and Steve Schiff, a guitarist and songwriter from the Nina Hagen band. Forsey and Schiff wrote it for Simple Minds, and offered it to several acts before Simple Minds agreed to record it. The song was used in the 1985 John Hughes film The Breakfast Club and the 2010 film Easy A.

Theme
"Don't You (Forget About Me)" was written by the producer Keith Forsey and the guitarist Steve Schiff while they were scoring the 1985 film The Breakfast Club. Forsey and Schiff were inspired by the scene in which an introvert and a school bully bond while no one else is watching. Forsey said, "It was: don't forget, when we're back in the classroom, you're not just a bad guy and we've got other things in common."

Recording
Schiff and Forsey were Simple Minds fans and wrote the song with the band in mind. After Forsey played a demo for the band's label, A&M Records, A&M invited him to meet the band backstage after one of their "Tour du Monde" shows in the U.S. However, A&M did not notify Simple Minds that Forsey was coming, and the band declined to record the song.

Forsey offered "Don't You (Forget About Me)" to Bryan Ferry, who declined as he was working on his album Boys and Girls. Ferry said later: "It was just bad timing ... Keith Forsey sent me a demo of the song and it sounded like a hit to me. Simple Minds did a great version of it." Billy Idol, whom Forsey was producing at the time, also declined. A&M suggested Corey Hart, who had a hit at the time with "Sunglasses at Night", but Forsey did not think Hart was the right singer. Cy Curnin, the lead singer of the Fixx, also declined.

According to the Simple Minds frontman Jim Kerr, Simple Minds were reluctant to record the song as they felt they should only record their own material. They also were frustrated that their attempts to find success in the US market had not found significant radio airplay, and did not see how recording the song would change this.

The band relented after persuasion from A&M and from Chrissie Hynde, Kerr's wife at the time, and after receiving a phone call from Forsey in which he reiterated his admiration for the band. According to one account, the band "rearranged and recorded 'Don't You (Forget About Me)' in three hours in the north London studio and promptly forgot about it," believing that it would be a throwaway song on the soundtrack to a forgettable movie.

In the process of recording, Simple Minds added parts such as Kerr's "la la la" vocal fills. They resumed work on Once Upon a Time, their next album. However, some of the band members had realised they had recorded something with commercial potential.

Music video
The music video, filmed inside Knebworth House, Hertfordshire, was directed by Daniel Kleinman.  It takes place in a darkened room with a chandelier, a rocking horse, a jukebox, and television sets displaying scenes from The Breakfast Club. The room gets increasingly cluttered with random objects as the video progresses until the last minute. The video was published on YouTube on 3 December 2010; as of July 2022, it had been viewed more than 240 million times.

Release and reception
The song became a number-one hit in the US in May 1985 and in Canada in June 1985. It is also the band's only number-one hit on the US Top Rock Tracks chart, staying atop that chart for three weeks. While only reaching number seven in the UK, it stayed on the charts from 1985 to 1987, one of the longest timespans for any single in the history of the chart.

Cash Box said that "though the lyric theme is a simple enough declaration, the lead vocals and vivid orchestration make the tune complex and moving."

The song did not appear on the band's subsequent album Once Upon a Time, but it did appear on the 1992 greatest hits compilation Glittering Prize 81/92. It soon became a fixture of the band's live sets – with an extended audience participation section during its inclusion on the 2015 tour to promote the band's Big Music album.

Two versions were created for release. A short version, 4:23 in duration, appeared on the single and the original motion-picture soundtrack album of The Breakfast Club. A longer version, 6:32 in duration, was released as a 12-inch single. This version contains longer breakdowns and drum fills, a second appearance of the bridge, and a longer ending.

John Leland from Spin wrote, Don't You Forget About Me,' a romantic and melancholy dance track, therefore cuts ice both in the living room and on the dance floor."

Track listing

7″: Virgin/VS749 (UK), 7″: A&M Records/AM-2703 (US) 
 "Don't You (Forget About Me)" – 4:20
 "A Brass Band in Africa" – 5:10

12″: Virgin/VS749-12 (UK), 12″: A&M Records/SP-12125 (US) 
 "Don't You (Forget About Me)" – 6:32
 "A Brass Band in African Chimes" – 9:22

12″: Virgin/VSX 1250 (Canada) 
 "Don't You (Forget About Me)" (extended version) – 6:32
 "Don't You (Forget About Me)" – 4:20
 "A Brass Band in Africa" – 5:10

1988 3″ CD: Virgin/CDT2 (UK) 
 "Don't You (Forget About Me)" – 4:20
 "A Brass Band in African Chimes" – 9:22

1988 CD: A&M Records/75021 2375 2 (US) 
 "Don't You (Forget About Me)" (live) – 9:02
 "Bass Line" – 4:37
 "The American" – 3:33

1990 CD: Virgin/THEME10 (UK) 
 "Don't You (Forget About Me)" – 6:35
 "Up on the Catwalk" (extended version) – 7:36
 "A Brass Band in African Chimes" – 9:24

Personnel
 Jim Kerr – lead vocals
 Charlie Burchill – guitar, keyboards
 Mick MacNeil – composer, keyboards
 Derek Forbes – bass guitar
 Mel Gaynor – drums, percussion

Charts

Weekly charts

Year-end charts

All-time charts

Certifications

See also

List of number-one singles of 1985 (Canada)
List of Billboard Hot 100 number-one singles of the 1980s
List of Billboard Hot 100 number-one singles of 1985
List of Billboard Mainstream Rock number-one songs of the 1980s
List of Dutch Top 40 number-one singles of 1985

Notes

References

External links
[ AllMusic: Keith Forsey]

The Breakfast Club
1985 singles
1985 songs
Simple Minds songs
Billboard Hot 100 number-one singles
Cashbox number-one singles
Dutch Top 40 number-one singles
RPM Top Singles number-one singles
Songs written by Keith Forsey
Song recordings produced by Keith Forsey
Songs written for films
Virgin Records singles
A&M Records singles
Billy Idol songs
Victoria Justice songs
Victorious